Dinophysis norvegica is a species of dinoflagellate most commonly associated with diarrheal shellfish poisoning.

References

Further reading

Dinophyceae